Shiobara Dam is a gravity dam located in Tochigi prefecture in Japan. The dam is used for flood control and irrigation. The catchment area of the dam is 119.5 km2. The dam impounds about 41  ha of land when full and can store 8760 thousand cubic meters of water. The construction of the dam was started on 1969 and completed in 1978.

References

Dams in Tochigi Prefecture
1978 establishments in Japan